Ethmia tamaridella is a moth in the family Depressariidae. It was described by Rebel in 1907. It is found in Yemen (Socotra).

References

Moths described in 1907
tamaridella
Endemic fauna of Socotra